Macaranga mauritiana is a species of plant in the family Euphorbiaceae. It is endemic to Mauritius.

References

mauritiana
Endemic flora of Mauritius
Endangered plants
Taxonomy articles created by Polbot
Plants described in 1866
Taxa named by Wenceslas Bojer
Taxa named by Henri Ernest Baillon